Old Saint George Church is a historic Catholic church in the Corryville neighborhood of Cincinnati, Ohio, near the University of Cincinnati. It was listed in the National Register of Historic Places on March 3, 1980, as St. George Parish and Newman Center.

The red brick church was designed by Samuel Hannaford in the Romanesque Revival style, and opened in 1873. Construction costs totaled $80,000. 

Declining attendance brought about by shifts in neighborhood demographics and worship habits in the 1970s and 1980s led the Roman Catholic Archdiocese of Cincinnati to consolidate the parish with St. Monica's and close the church in 1993. The property was sold the following year to a group called the Christian Ministries Center, which operated a community and arts center out of it until 2004. St. George's two steeples caught fire and partially collapsed on February 1, 2008.

In March 2015, Crossroads Church acquired the property from the Clifton Heights Community Urban Development Corporation and announced plans to renovate and occupy it as their fifth location in Ohio. 

In August 2016, the church reopened as a satellite campus for Crossroads.

Notes

External links

 Crossroads at Old St. George

National Register of Historic Places in Cincinnati
Roman Catholic churches in Cincinnati
Former Roman Catholic church buildings in Ohio
Samuel Hannaford church buildings